Grizzly Mountain is located in the Lewis Range, Glacier National Park in the U.S. state of Montana. Grizzly Mountain sits astride the Continental Divide in the Two Medicine region of Glacier National Park.

See also
 Mountains and mountain ranges of Glacier National Park (U.S.)

References

Mountains of Glacier County, Montana
Mountains of Flathead County, Montana
Mountains of Glacier National Park (U.S.)
Lewis Range